April Ross Lim Perez is a Filipino fashion model and beauty queen. She competed in the second edition of the national Miss Philippines beauty pageant and was crowned Miss Philippines 2002.

Personal background
Perez, a Chavacana was born and grew up in Zamboanga City, Philippines and now based in San Francisco, California. She obtained Bachelor of Science degree from the Ateneo de Zamboanga University.

As a model, she appeared in television commercials like San Miguel Beer, Rejoice, Smartphone, Ayala Mall, Lucky Me, Ricky Reyes, Avon Products and FHM’s cover model.

Pageant competitions

Miss Philippines Earth 2002
Perez participated in the national Miss Philippines Earth 2002 beauty pageant and won special prizes: Miss Close-Up, Miss Avon, and Miss Texter Choice and "Best in Swimsuit." She bested 23 other delegates and eventually emerged as the winner of the competition and was crowned Miss Philippines 2002.

Miss Earth 2002
Perez competed and became a semi-finalist in the Miss Earth 2002  pageant won by Džejla Glavović of Bosnia and Herzegovina.

Environmental work
On September 21, 2002, Perez and Miss Earth 2001 Catharina Svensson of Denmark led the Miss Earth 2002 delegates in the yearly "International Coastal Clean Up" with the aim of collecting and documenting the trash littering in the coastline and to promote environmental awareness.

On February 12, 2003, Perez was the guest speaker on the opening of the Philippine Department of Environment and Natural Resources' Baungon central nursery, a 5,000-square meter nursery that can accommodate 40,000 seedlings in Liburon, Baungon, Bukidnon.

References

External links
Official Miss Earth website
Miss Earth Foundation website

Living people
Miss Earth 2002 contestants
Miss Philippines Earth winners
1981 births
People from Zamboanga City
Star Magic